Carbon neutrality is a state of net zero carbon dioxide emissions. This can be achieved by balancing emissions of carbon dioxide by eliminating emissions from society (the transition to the "post-carbon economy") or carbon dioxide removal (such as through carbon offsetting). The term is used in the context of carbon dioxide-releasing processes associated with transport, energy production, agriculture, and industry.

Although the term "carbon neutral" is used, a carbon footprint also includes other greenhouse gases, measured in terms of their carbon dioxide equivalence. The term climate-neutral reflects the broader inclusiveness of other greenhouse gases in climate change, even if CO2 is the most abundant.

The term net zero is increasingly used to describe a broader and more comprehensive commitment to decarbonization and climate action, moving beyond carbon neutrality by including more activities under the scope of indirect emissions, and often including a science-based target on emissions reduction, as opposed to relying solely on offsetting. Some climate scientists have stated that "the idea of net zero has licensed a recklessly cavalier 'burn now, pay later' approach which has seen carbon emissions continue to soar."

History 

In 2006, the New Oxford American Dictionary made the term carbon-neutral word of the year.

In December 2020, five years after the Paris Agreement, the Secretary-General of the United Nations António Guterres warned that the commitments made by countries in Paris were not sufficient and were not respected. He has urged all other countries to declare climate emergencies until carbon neutrality is reached.

In May 2021, the International Energy Agency (IEA) published Net Zero by 2050, a comprehensive study to demonstrate what changes would need to be done in order for the world to reach net zero carbon emissions by the year 2050. It compared the current state of affairs with projections matching the changes the report suggested in order to demonstrate a possible path towards the carbon neutrality goal.

Method 
Carbon-neutral status can be achieved in two ways, although a combination of the two is most likely required:

Ending emissions 
Ending carbon emissions can be done by moving towards energy sources and industry processes that produce no greenhouse gases, thereby transitioning to a zero-carbon economy. Shifting towards the use of renewable energy such as wind, geothermal, and solar power, zero-energy systems like passive daytime radiative cooling, as well as nuclear power, reduces greenhouse gas emissions. Although both renewable and non-renewable energy production produce carbon emissions in some form, renewable sources produce negligible to almost zero carbon emissions. Transitioning to a low-carbon economy would also mean making changes to current industrial and agricultural processes to reduce carbon emissions, for example, diet changes to livestock such as cattle can potentially reduce methane production by 40%. Carbon projects and emissions trading are often used to reduce carbon emissions, and carbon dioxide can even sometimes be prevented from entering the atmosphere entirely (such as by carbon scrubbing).

One way to implement carbon-neutral products is by making these products cheaper and more cost effective than carbon positive fuels. Various companies have pledged to become carbon neutral or negative by 2050, some of which include: Microsoft, Delta Air Lines, BP, IKEA, and BlackRock, although these distant pledges are typically not matched by real action and are often greenwashing - for instance with BP spending more on fossil fuels in 2022 than renewables despite its net zero pledge.

Carbon offsetting 
Balancing remaining carbon dioxide emissions with carbon offsets is the process of reducing or avoiding greenhouse gas emissions or removing carbon dioxide from the atmosphere to make up for emissions elsewhere. If the total greenhouse gases emitted is equal to the total amount avoided or removed, then the two effects cancel each other out and the net emissions are 'neutral'.

Process

Carbon neutrality is usually achieved by combining the following steps, although these may vary depending whether the strategy is being implemented by individuals, companies, organizations, cities, regions, or countries:

Commitment
In the case of individuals, decision-making is likely to be straightforward, but for more complex institutions it usually requires political leadership and popular agreement that the effort is worth making.

Commitment from countries and the organizations within is critical to the forward movement of Carbon Neutrality. The Net Zero Challenge Report states that "commitments made by governments so far are far from sufficient." One way to obtain more commitment would be to set carbon-neutral goals but allow flexibility for the organizations and governments to decide how to achieve these goals. Large well-known companies like Apple are laying out roadmaps to help these commitments become a reality. Then lesser well-known companies like Kinaxis, a supply chain management company, met their net-zero goal in 2020 by fully committing to their carbon emission objectives.

Counting and analyzing
Counting and analyzing the emissions that need to be eliminated, and how it can be done, is an important step in the process of achieving carbon neutrality, as it establishes the priorities for where action needs to be taken and progress can begin being monitored. This can be achieved through a greenhouse gas inventory that aims to answer questions such as:

 Which operations, activities and units should be targeted?
 Which sources should be included (see section Direct and indirect emissions)?
 Who is responsible for which emissions?
 Which gases should be included?

For individuals, carbon calculators simplify compiling an inventory. Typically they measure electricity consumption in kWh, the amount and type of fuel used to heat water and warm the house, and how many kilometers an individual drives, flies and rides in different vehicles. Individuals may also set the limits of the system they are concerned with, for example, whether they want to balance out their personal greenhouse gas emissions, their household emissions, or their company's.

There are plenty of carbon calculators available online, which vary significantly in the parameters they measure. Some, for example, factor in only cars, aircraft and household energy use. Others cover household waste or leisure interests as well. In some circumstances, going beyond carbon neutral and becoming carbon negative (usually after a certain length of time taken to reach carbon breakeven) is an objective.

Cities and countries are challenging for carbon counting and analyzing. This is because the production of goods and services within their territory can be linked either to domestic consumption or exports. On the other hand, citizens also consume imported goods and services. To avoid double counting in the calculation of emissions, it should be specified where the emissions should be counted: at the point of production or consumption. This can be complicated given the long production chains in a globalized economy. In addition, embodied energy and the consequences of large-scale resource extraction needed for renewable energy systems and EV batteries are likely to present their own complications – local point-of-use emissions are likely to be greatly reduced, but life cycle emissions may still remain significant.

Reduction
One of the strongest arguments for reducing greenhouse gas emissions is that it will often save money. Examples of possible actions to reduce greenhouse gas emissions are:

 Limiting energy usage and emissions from transportation (walking, using bicycles or public transport, avoiding flying, using low-energy vehicles, carpooling), as well as from buildings, equipment, animals and processes.
 Obtaining electricity and other forms of energy from zero or low carbon energy sources.
 Electrification: using electrical energy, ideally from non-emitting sources, rather than combustion. For example, in transportation (e.g., electric vehicles and electric trains) and heating (e.g. heat pumps and electric heating).

Wind power, nuclear power, hydropower, solar power, and geothermal are the energy sources with the lowest life-cycle emissions, which includes deployment and operations.

Offsetting
Carbon offsetting is the practice of removing greenhouse gases from the atmosphere equivalent to the emissions generated by other activities. This is often done by paying "projects that either emit fewer emissions at source, such as cleaner energy production, or remove them from the atmosphere, such as forestry schemes." This aims to neutralize a certain volume of greenhouse gas emissions by funding activities which are expected to cause an equivalent reduction elsewhere, for example, with paid-for ecosystem services, such as blue carbon. Offsetting schemes can also have significant co-benefits such as improving quality of life and reducing poverty.

Carbon offsetting has been critiqued on several fronts. One of the main concerns has been the potential for offsets to delay needed action on active emissions reductions. In 2007, for example, in a report from the Transnational Institute, Kevin Smith likens carbon offsets to medieval indulgences where people pay "offset companies to absolve them of their carbon sins." This, he contends, permits a "business as usual" attitude that stifles the required major changes. Offsets have also been widely criticised for playing a part in greenwashing, an argument which has even mobilised in a 2021 watchdog ruling against Shell.

Another critique of offsetting has been that loose regulation of claims by carbon offsetting schemes that, combined with the difficulties in calculating greenhouse gas sequestration and emissions reductions, can result in schemes that do not in reality adequately offset emissions. Moves have been made to create better regulation. The United Nations, for instance, has operated a certification process for carbon offsets since 2001 called the Clean Development Mechanism. This aims to stimulate "sustainable development and emission reductions, while giving industrialized countries some flexibility in how they meet their emission reduction limitation targets." However, the UK Government's Climate Change Committee has also noted that "Although standards both globally and in the UK are being improved, the risk remains that the emissions reduction or removal reported may have happened anyway or may not persist into the future."

Criticisms have also been levelled at the use of non-native and monocultural forest plantations as carbon offsets for its "limited—and at times negative—effects on native biodiversity" and other ecosystem services.

Evaluation and repeating
This phase includes evaluation of the results and compilation of a list of suggested improvements, with results documented and reported, so that experience gained of what does (and does not) work is shared with those who can put it to good use. Science and technology move on, regulations become tighter, the standards people demand go up. So the second cycle will go further than the first, and the process will continue, each successive phase building on and improving on what went before.

Being carbon neutral is increasingly seen as good corporate or state social responsibility and a growing list of corporations and states are announcing dates for when they intend to become fully neutral. Events such as the G8 Summit and organizations like the World Bank are also using offset schemes to become carbon neutral. Artists like The Rolling Stones and Pink Floyd have made albums or tours carbon neutral.

Direct and indirect emissions
To be considered carbon neutral, an organization must reduce its carbon footprint to zero. Determining what to include in the carbon footprint depends upon the organization and the standards they are following.

Generally, direct emissions sources must be reduced and offset completely, while indirect emissions from purchased electricity can be reduced with renewable energy purchases.

Direct emissions include all pollution from manufacturing, company owned vehicles and reimbursed travel, livestock and any other source that is directly controlled by the owner. Indirect emissions include all emissions that result from the use or purchase of a product. For instance, the direct emissions of an airline are all the jet fuel that is burned, while the indirect emissions include manufacture and disposal of airplanes, all the electricity used to operate the airline's office, and the daily emissions from employee travel to and from work. In another example, the power company has a direct emission of greenhouse gas, while the office that purchases it considers it an indirect emission.

Cities and countries represent a challenge with regard to emissions counting as production of goods and services within their territory can be related either to domestic consumption or exports. Conversely the citizens also consume imported goods and services. To avoid double counting in any emissions calculation it should be made clear where the emissions are to be counted: at the site of production or consumption. This may be complicated given long production chains in a globalized economy. Moreover, the embodied energy and consequences of large-scale raw material extraction required for renewable energy systems and electric vehicle batteries is likely to represent its own complications – local emissions at the site of utilization are likely to be very small but life-cycle emissions can still be significant.

Carbon is used as both a source of electricity and a feedstock in energy-intensive industries, making decarbonization impossible. If  emissions and sources are to be captured and stopped from entering the atmosphere, an alternate chemical solution must be formulated that achieves the desired output while not releasing  as a by-product.

Simplification of standards and definitions
Carbon neutral fuels are those that neither contribute to nor reduce the amount of carbon into the atmosphere. Before an agency can certify an organization or individual as carbon neutral, it is important to specify whether indirect emissions are included in the Carbon Footprint calculation. Most Voluntary Carbon neutral certifiers in the US, require both direct and indirect sources to be reduced and offset. As an example, for an organization to be certified carbon neutral, it must offset all direct and indirect emissions from travel by 1 lb CO2e per passenger mile, and all non-electricity direct emissions 100%. Indirect electrical purchases must be equalized either with offsets, or renewable energy purchases. This standard differs slightly from the widely used World Resources Institute and may be easier to calculate and apply.

Much of the confusion in carbon neutral standards can be attributed to the number of voluntary carbon standards which are available. For organizations looking at which carbon offsets to purchase, knowing which standards are robust, credible and permanent is vital in choosing the right carbon offsets and projects to get involved in. Some of the main standards in the voluntary market include Verified Carbon Standard, Gold Standard and The American Carbon Registry. In addition companies can purchase Certified Emission Reductions (CERs) which result from mitigated carbon emissions from United Nations Framework Convention on Climate Change approved projects for voluntary purposes. The concept of shared resources also reduces the volume of carbon a particular organization has to offset, with all upstream and downstream emissions the responsibility of other organizations or individuals. If all organizations and individuals were involved then this would not result in any double accounting.

Regarding terminology in UK, in December 2011 the Advertising Standards Authority (in an ASA decision which was upheld by its Independent Reviewer, Sir Hayden Phillips) controversially ruled that no manufactured product can be marketed as "zero-carbon", because carbon was inevitably emitted during its manufacture. This decision was made in relation to a solar panel system whose embodied carbon was repaid during 1.2 years of use and it appears to mean that no buildings or manufactured products can legitimately be described as zero carbon in its jurisdiction.

Pledges
Being carbon neutral is increasingly seen as good corporate or state social responsibility, and a growing list of corporations, cities and states are announcing dates for when they intend to become fully neutral. Many countries have also announced dates by which they want to be carbon neutral, with many of them targeting the year 2050. However, setting an earlier date (i.e. 2025, 2030, or 2045) may be considered to send out a stronger signal internationally, and is recommended by the Climate Crisis Advisory Group. Also, delaying significant action to reduce greenhouse gas emissions is increasingly being considered to not be a financially sound idea.

Companies and organizations
The original Climate Neutral Network was an Oregon-based non-profit organization founded by Sue Hall and incorporated in 1999 to persuade companies that being climate neutral was potentially cost saving as well as environmentally sustainable. It developed both the Climate Neutral Certification and Climate Cool brand name with key stakeholders such as the United States Environmental Protection Agency, The Nature Conservancy, the Rocky Mountain Institute, Conservation International, and the World Resources Institute and succeeded in enrolling the 2002 Winter Olympics to compensate for its associated greenhouse gas emissions.

Few companies have actually attained Climate Neutral Certification, applying to a rigorous review process and establishing that they have achieved absolute net zero or better impact on the world's climate. Another reason that companies have difficulty in attaining the Climate Neutral Certification is due the lack clear guidelines on what it means to make a carbon neutral development. Shaklee Corporation became the first Climate Neutral certified company in April 2000. The company employs a variety of investments, and offset activities, including tree-planting, use of solar energy, methane capture in abandoned mines and its manufacturing processes. Climate Neutral Business Network states that it certified Dave Matthews Band's concert tour as Climate Neutral. The Christian Science Monitor criticized the use of NativeEnergy, a for-profit company that sells offset credits to businesses and celebrities like Dave Matthews.

Salt Spring Coffee became carbon neutral by lowering emissions through reducing long-range trucking and using bio-diesel fuel in delivery trucks, upgrading to energy efficient equipment and purchasing carbon offsets from its offset provider, Offsetters. The company claims to the first carbon neutral coffee sold in Canada. Salt Spring Coffee was recognized by the David Suzuki Foundation in their 2010 report Doing Business in a New Climate.

Some corporate examples of self-proclaimed carbon neutral and climate neutral initiatives include Dell, Google, HSBC, ING Group, PepsiCo, Sky Group, Tesco, Toronto-Dominion Bank, Asos and Bank of Montreal.

Under the leadership of Secretary-General Ban Ki-moon, the United Nations pledged to work towards climate neutrality in December 2007. The United Nations Environment Programme (UNEP) announced it was becoming climate neutral in 2008 and established a Climate Neutral Network to promote the idea in February 2008.

Events such as the G8 Summit and organizations like the World Bank are also using offset schemes to become carbon neutral. Artists like The Rolling Stones and Pink Floyd have made albums or tours carbon neutral, while Live Earth says that its seven concerts held on 7 July 2007 were the largest carbon neutral public event in history.

The Vancouver 2010 Olympic and Paralympic Winter Games were the first carbon neutral Games in history through a large partnership with the carbon offset provider, Offsetters.

Buildings, in 2019, made up 21% of global greenhouse gas emissions. The American Institute of Architects 2030 Commitment is a voluntary program for AIA member firms and other entities in the built environment that asks these organizations to pledge to design all their buildings to be carbon neutral by 2030.

In 2010, architectural firm HOK worked with energy and daylighting consultant The Weidt Group to design a  net zero carbon emissions Class A office building prototype in St. Louis, Missouri, U.S.

Goodvalley became a carbon neutral company as the first pork meat producer. It was possible by lowering greenhouse gases emission at every stage of production. In addition to reducing its primary carbon footprint, the company achieves carbon neutrality by producing green energy from its agricultural biogas plants. The sum of  emissions and reductions are calculated by NIRAS and since 2018, the calculation has labelled Goodvalley Group Corporate Carbon Neutral. The certification is done according to ISO-14064 and verified by TÜV Rheinland.

Since 2019, an increasing number of business organisations have committed to attaining carbon neutrality by, or before, 2050, such as Microsoft (2030), Amazon (2040), and L'Oreal (2050).

In 2020, BlackRock, the world's largest investment firm, announced that it would begin making decisions with climate change and sustainability in mind, and begin exiting assets that it believed represented a "high sustainablilty-related risk". Activists have accused the company of greenwashing, as it still has a considerable amount of money invested in coal companies. In CEO Larry Fink's 2021 annual letter, however, he further pushed for businesses to begin laying out explicit plans on how they will be carbon neutral by 2050.

Countries and nations

Three countries have achieved or surpassed carbon neutrality:

  (carbon-negative)
  (carbon negative since 2014, at least)
  probably carbon negative as of 2021, certification expected to arrive.

The 3 countries formed a small coalition at the 2021 United Nations Climate Change Conference and asked for help so that other countries will join it.

, numerous countries/nations have pledged carbon neutrality, including:

Canada
In June 2011, the Canadian province of British Columbia announced they had officially become the first provincial/state jurisdiction in North America to achieve carbon neutrality in public sector operations: Every school, hospital, university, Crown corporation, and government office measured, reported, and purchased carbon offsets on all of their 2010 greenhouse gas emissions as required under legislation. Local Governments across B.C. began to declare carbon neutrality, including the Regional District of Mount Waddington on Vancouver Island, whose indoor ice arena, the Chilton Regional Arena, is now carbon neutral and relies on solely on electricity from flooding their ice to mowing the grass. The province intended to accelerate the deployment of natural gas vehicles. Under the LiveSmart BC initiative, natural gas furnaces and water heaters receive cash back thereby promoting the burning of fossil fuel in the province. The province stated that an important part of new natural gas production will come from the Horn River basin where about 500 million tonnes of  will be released into the atmosphere.

On 24 September 2019, Prime Minister Justin Trudeau pledged to make Canada carbon neutral by 2050 if re-elected. On 21 October 2019, Trudeau was re-elected, and in December 2019, the Canadian government formally announced its goal for Canada to be carbon neutral by 2050. In its speech from the throne, which was delivered on 23 September 2020, the federal government pledged to legislate its goal of making Canada carbon neutral by 2050.

The city of Edmonton, Alberta, is currently developing a carbon neutral community called Blatchford, on the grounds of its former City Centre Airport.

China 
By 2020, China has announced its goal of achieving carbon neutrality and has decided to complete this strategic plan by 2060.

Costa Rica
Costa Rica aims to be fully carbon neutral by at least 2050. In 2004, 46.7% of Costa Rica's primary energy came from renewable sources, while 94% of its electricity was generated from hydroelectric power, wind farms and geothermal energy in 2006. A 3.5% tax on gasoline in the country is used for payments to compensate landowners for growing trees and protecting forests and its government is making further plans for reducing emissions from transport, farming and industry. In 2019, Costa Rica was one of the first countries that crafted a national decarbonization plan.

European Union
The EU has intermediate targets and in 2019 the bloc, with the exception of Poland, agreed to set a 2050 target for carbon neutrality.

The European Union has become the first area to embrace climate neutrality by 2050 through the European Green Deal, being committed to forming Green Alliances with partner nations and regions across the world.

On 29 September 2021, the EU Commission launched 100 Climate-Neutral and Smart Cities by 2030, one of the five EU missions. This EU mission aims to have 100+ carbon-neutral and smart cities by 2030 and also, inspire other cities towards the EU target of carbon neutrality by 2050.

On 28 April 2022, the EU Commission announced a list of 112 cities, which were selected from more than 370 cities, who have pledged to be part of the EU mission's goal of 100 Climate-Neutral and Smart Cities by 2030.

Denmark
Samsø island in Denmark, with a population of 4200, based on wind-generated electricity and biomass-based district heating currently generate extra wind power and export the electricity to compensate for petro-fueled vehicles. There are future hopes of using electric or biofuel vehicles.

France
On 27 June 2019, the French National Assembly voted into law the first article in a climate and energy package that sets goals for France to cut its greenhouse gas emissions and go carbon-neutral by 2050 in line with the 2015 Paris climate agreement. This was approved by the French Senate on 18 July 2019.

Iceland
Iceland is also moving towards climate neutrality. Iceland generates over 99% of its electricity from renewable sources, namely hydroelectricity (approximately 80%) and geothermal (approximately 20%). No other nation uses such a high proportion of renewable energy resources. Over 99% of electricity production and almost 80% of total energy production comes from hydropower and geothermal. In February 2008, Costa Rica, Iceland, New Zealand and Norway were the first four countries to join the Climate Neutral Network, an initiative led by the United Nations Environment Programme (UNEP) to catalyze global action towards low carbon economies and societies.

According to a 2019 study in the northern Icelandic municipality of Akureyri, low carbon transition will be effective by integrating disconnected carbon flows and establishing intermediary organisations. Reykjavík aims to be carbon neutral by 2040.

Japan 
In October 2020, Japan announced its plans to reach carbon neutrality in real terms by 2050, this passed the National Diet and was codified in law on 26 May 2021.

Maldives
In March 2009, Mohamed Nasheed, then president of the Maldives, pledged to make his country carbon-neutral within a decade by moving to wind and solar power. After he left the office, successive administrations abandoned the plan.

New Zealand
On 7 November 2019, New Zealand passed a bill requiring the country to be net zero for all greenhouse gases by 2050 (with the exception of biogenic methane, with plans to reduce that by 2447% below 2017 levels by 2050).

Norway
On 19 April 2007, Prime Minister Jens Stoltenberg announced to the Labour Party annual congress that Norway's greenhouse gas emissions would be cut by 10 percent more than its Kyoto commitment by 2012, and that the government had agreed to achieve emission cuts of 30% by 2020. He also proposed that Norway should become carbon neutral by 2050, and called upon other rich countries to do likewise. This carbon neutrality would be achieved partly by carbon offsetting, a proposal criticized by Greenpeace, who also called on Norway to take responsibility for the 500m tonnes of emissions caused by its exports of oil and gas. World Wildlife Fund Norway also believes that the purchase of carbon offsets is unacceptable, saying "it is a political stillbirth to believe that China will quietly accept that Norway will buy climate quotas abroad". The Norwegian environmental activist Bellona Foundation believes that Stoltenberg was forced to act due to pressure from anti-European Union members of the coalition government, and called the announcement "visions without content".

In January 2008, the Norwegian government went a step further and declared a goal of being carbon neutral by 2030. But the government has not been specific about any plans to reduce emissions at home; the plan is based on buying carbon offsets from other countries, and little has actually been done to reduce Norway's emissions, apart from a very successful policy for electric vehicles

Spain
In Spain, in 2014, the island of El Hierro became carbon neutral (for its power production). Also, the city of Logroño Montecorvo in La Rioja will be carbon neutral once completed.

In May 2021, Spain adopted the Climate Change and Energy Transition Law to achieve carbon neutrality by 2050. In October 2021, Prime Minister Pedro Sánchez released Spain 2050 report which sets 50 milestones towards Spain's goal to achieve carbon neutrality.

Sweden
Sweden aims to become carbon neutral by 2045. The Climate Act which enforces actions towards that goal was established in June 2017 and implemented in the beginning of 2018, making Sweden the first country with a legally-binding carbon neutrality target. The vision is that net greenhouse gas emissions should be zero. The overall objective is that the increase in global temperature should be limited to two degrees, and that the concentration of greenhouse gases in the atmosphere stabilizes at a maximum of 400 ppm.

In April 2022 an agreement between major parties in the Swedish Parliament was reached to include consumption and exports in its carbon neutrality target, which would make Sweden the first country in the world to include emissions from international trade in the pledges to mitigate climate change.

South Korea
South Korea aims to be carbon neutral by 2050, and enacted, on 31 August 2021, the enactment of the Carbon Neutral and Green Growth Basic Act, which stipulates the achievement of greenhouse gas reduction. This bill, also called the 'Climate Crisis Response Act', mandates, by 2030, a 35% greenhouse gas reduction in the country compared to 2018.

Vatican City
In July 2007, Vatican City announced a plan to become the first carbon-neutral state in the world, following the politics of the Pope to eliminate global warming. The goal would have been reached through a forest donated by a carbon offsetting company, which would have been located in the Bükk National Park, Hungary. Eventually no trees were planted under the project and the carbon offsets did not materialise.

In November 2008, the city state also installed and put into operation 2,400 solar panels on the roof of the Paul VI Centre audience hall.

United Kingdom
As recommended by the Committee on Climate Change (CCC) the government has legally committed to net zero greenhouse gas emissions by the United Kingdom by 2050 and the Energy and Climate Intelligence Unit (ECIU) has said it would be affordable. A range of techniques will be required including carbon sinks (greenhouse gas removal) in order to counterbalance emissions from agriculture and aviation. These carbon sinks might include reforestation, habitat restoration, soil carbon sequestration, bioenergy with carbon capture and storage and even direct air capture.

In 2020, the UK government has linked attainment of net zero targets as a potential mechanism for improved air quality as a co-benefit. The UK government estimated that eliminating fossil fuels for home heating and transportation could lead to a tripling of demand for electricity.

Scotland
Scotland has set a 2045 target. The islands of Orkney have significant wind and marine energy resources, and renewable energy has recently come into prominence. Although Orkney is connected to the mainland, it generates over 100% of its net power from renewables. This comes mainly from wind turbines situated right across Orkney

Thailand
Thailand aims to achieve carbon neutrality by 2050. As an initiative towards the carbon neutrality goal, Thailand's Ministry of Natural Resources and Environment launched its first Carbon Credit Exchange in 2022.

Taiwan
Taiwan has a 2050 target to achieve carbon neutrality. The Department of Forestry and Nature Conservation, Chinese Culture University and Forestry Economics Division, Taiwan Forestry Research Institute presented a study in August 2012 indicating that afforestation can offset the carbon footprint to implementing carbon neutrality. They analyzed the carbon reduction benefits of afforested air quality enhancement zones (AQEZs) established by the government in 1995.

Certification
Although there is currently no international certification scheme for carbon or climate neutrality, some countries have established national certification schemes. Examples include Norwegian Eco-Lighthouse Program and the Australian government's Climate Active certification. In the private sector, organizations such as ClimatePartner can, for a fee, allow companies from many sectors to offset their carbon emissions using techniques like reforestation. These companies can then claim climate neutral status and even use the title online. However, there is no international clarity around these certifications and their validity.

Certifications are also available from the CEB, BSI (PAS 2060) and The CarbonNeutral Company (CarbonNeutral).

Criticism
Tracing the history of certain illusions in climate policy from 1988 to 2021, climate scientists James Dyke, Robert Watson, and Wolfgang Knorr "[arrive] at the painful realisation that the idea of net zero has licensed a recklessly cavalier 'burn now, pay later' approach which has seen carbon emissions continue to soar...
Current net zero policies will not keep warming to within 1.5 °C because they were never intended to. They were and still are driven by a need to protect business as usual, not the climate. If we want to keep people safe then large and sustained cuts to carbon emissions need to happen now. ...The time for wishful thinking is over."

In March 2021, Tzeporah Berman, chair of the Fossil Fuel Non-Proliferation Treaty Initiative, argued that the Treaty would be a more genuine and realistic way to achieve the goals of the Paris Agreement than the "Net zero" approach which, she claimed, is "delusional and based on bad science."

Eric Reguly, of the Globe and Mail states that, "The net-zero pledges are both welcome and dubious.
Most are back-end loaded, meaning the majority of the cuts are to come well after 2030... Most of these targets also assume...steady technological advances and outright breakthroughs...Fossil fuel exports will not figure into the national accounting for the net-zero goal."

In his 16-page report, Dangerous Distractions, economist Marc Lee states that, Net zero' has the potential to be a dangerous distraction that reduces the political pressure to achieve actual emission reductions..." "A net zero target means less incentive to get to 'real zero' emissions from fossil fuels, an escape hatch that perpetuates business as usual and delays more meaningful climate action...Rather than gambling on carbon removal technologies of the future, Canada should plan for a managed wind down of fossil fuel production and invest public resources in bona fide solutions like renewables and a just transition from fossil fuels."

See also

 2000-watt society
 Carbon cycle
 Carbon emission trading
 Carbon fee and dividend
 Carbon-neutral fuel
 Climate change mitigation
 Kardashev scale
 Live Earth
 Low-carbon diet
 Low Carbon Innovation Centre
 Nuclear power proposed as renewable energy
 Zero-energy building

Initiatives:
 Caring for Climate
 Carbon Neutrality Coalition
 Climate Clock
 Formula One - Net Zero Carbon by 2030;

References

Works cited

External links
 Climate neutral now, a 3-step approach to Climate neutrality from the UNFCCC
 ClimateClock: time left to reaching the 1,5°C threshold
 Kick the Habit: A UN guide to climate neutrality A UNEP Publication
 How is Carbon Footprint Calculated

Greenhouse gas emissions
Carbon dioxide
Renewable energy